Empress Zhang (張皇后, personal name unknown) was an empress of the Qiang-led Later Qin dynasty of China. Her husband was Yao Xing (Emperor Wenhuan).

Very little is known about Empress Zhang.  She was promoted to empress from the imperial consort title Zhaoyi (昭儀) in 402.  No further reference was made to her in history, including when she died or whether she had any children.

References 

|- style="text-align: center;"

|-

|-

|-

|-

|- style="text-align: center;"

|- style="text-align: center;"

Zhang, Empress Wenhuan